Ethnic groups 
Mossi people known as Mossé in their language Mooré

Mossé is a French surname. Notable people with the surname include:

 Gérald Mossé (born 1967), jockey
 Claude Mossé (1924–2022), French historian of ancient Greece
 :fr:Claude Mossé (journaliste) (born 1928), French journalist

French-language surnames